Thiagarajah or Thiyagarajah is a Tamil male given name. Due to the Tamil tradition of using patronymic surnames it may also be a surname for males and females.

Notable people

Given name
 Tyagaraja (1767-1847), Indian composer
 A. Thiagarajah (1916–1981), Sri Lankan politician
 M. Thiyagarajah, Sri Lankan politician
 M. D. Thyagaraja Pillai, Indian politician
 M. K. Thyagaraja Bhagavathar (1910-1959), Indian actor

Surname
 Chelvy Thiyagarajah (died 1991), Sri Lankan poet
 Daniel Thiagarajah, Sri Lankan bishop
 J. Tyagaraja (born 1895), Ceylonese politician
 Thiyagarajah Maheswaran (1966–2008), Sri Lankan politician

See also
 Thyagaiah (1946 film), 1946 Indian film about Tyagaraja

 
 
 

Tamil masculine given names